Stefano Provenzali was an Italian painter of the Baroque period, active in his native Cento. He was a pupil of Guercino. He is known for his paintings of battles.

References

Painters from Ferrara
17th-century Italian painters
Italian male painters
Italian Baroque painters
Italian battle painters
Year of death unknown
Year of birth unknown